Villars is a commune in the Dordogne department in Nouvelle-Aquitaine in southwestern France. Nearby towns include Brantôme and Nontron.

Villars' attractions include the Château de Puyguilhem, Grotte de Villars and the Abbaye de Boschaud.

Population

See also
Communes of the Dordogne department

References

Communes of Dordogne

simple:Villars